MI2, the British Military Intelligence Section 2, was a department of the British Directorate of Military Intelligence, part of  the War Office. It was originally set up to handle geographic information. MI2a handled the Americas (excluding Canada), Spain, Portugal, Italy, Liberia, Tangier, and the Balkans. MI2b handled the Ottoman Empire, Trans-Caucasus, Arabia, Sinai, Abyssinia, North Africa excluding French and Spanish possessions, Egypt, and the Sudan.

After the First World War, its role was changed to handle Russian and Scandinavian intelligence. These functions were absorbed into MI3 in 1941.

External links
MI5 FAQ
MI2 Military title

Defunct United Kingdom intelligence agencies
1910s establishments in the United Kingdom
1941 disestablishments in the United Kingdom
Military communications of the United Kingdom
War Office in World War II
British intelligence services of World War II